W. J. Wagstaffe (birth and death details unknown) was a New Zealand cricketer who played four matches of first-class cricket for Wellington between 1914 and 1920. 

Wagstaffe was a wicket-keeper and middle-order batsman. In the 1918–19 Wellington club season he scored a century and put on a partnership of 307 with Syd Hiddleston, a record for Wellington cricket. In the 1923–24 season he hit 210 in an afternoon in a senior Wellington club match at the Basin Reserve.

References

External links
 
 W. J. Wagstaffe at CricketArchive

19th-century births
20th-century deaths
New Zealand cricketers
Wellington cricketers